Disney's Hollywood Studios is a theme park located at the Walt Disney World Resort. Major attractions are listed below.

Hollywood Boulevard
Hollywood Boulevard is lined with shops selling Disney merchandise and food. While parades are a major attraction today, the area was not originally built to handle parades, and an appropriate sound system and other facilities had to be retrofitted after initial construction. Michael Eisner, who had a major part in the park's creation ever since the earliest development, wanted the opening land to operate on the same principle as Main Street, U.S.A. — a street lined with shops and food, but in a style more fitting to Hollywood.

 Mickey & Minnie's Runaway Railway, a trackless dark ride based on the Mickey Mouse animated shorts, as well as the first Mickey Mouse-themed ride-through attraction in the history of Walt Disney Parks, Experiences and Consumer Products.

Echo Lake

 Star Tours – The Adventures Continue, a 3D motion simulator ride, set in the Star Wars universe. It is the refurbished successor to the park's original attraction.
 Indiana Jones Epic Stunt Spectacular!, a live-action movie stunt performance re-enacting various scenes from the film, Raiders of the Lost Ark.
 For the First Time in Forever: A Frozen Sing-Along Celebration, a musical stage show retelling the story of the film.
 Jedi Training: Trials of the Temple, a live show based on the teachings and practices of the fictional Jedi Knights from the Star Wars films, depends heavily on audience participation, focusing on children. Each participant is given a lightsaber and Jedi robes and is taught a routine set of sword fighting moves.

Grand Avenue

 Muppet*Vision 3D, a 4D film experience starring The Muppets.

Star Wars: Galaxy's Edge 

Millennium Falcon: Smugglers Run
Star Wars: Rise of the Resistance

Toy Story Land

 Toy Story Mania!, an interactive 3D shooting gallery featuring characters from the Toy Story films. 
 Slinky Dog Dash, a family-friendly rollercoaster themed around Slinky Dog. The story goes that Andy used his "Mega Coaster Play Kit" to build around his backyard, and then put Slinky Dog on the track.
 Alien Swirling Saucers, an attraction similar to Mater's Junkyard Jamboree at Disney California Adventure, themed around the Claw and Little Green Aliens.

Animation Courtyard

 Disney Junior Dance Party!, a live performance in Soundstage Theater, featuring television characters from Mickey and the Roadster Racers, Vampirina, Doc McStuffins, and The Lion Guard.
 Star Wars Launch Bay, an interactive walkthrough attraction featuring Star Wars character meet-and-greets, memorabilia, games, and a gift shop.
 Voyage of the Little Mermaid, a live performance using puppets, lasers, movies, human actors, and water (mist) in the Animation Courtyard Theater. The show recreates the animated musical film of the same name, in an abbreviated form.
 Walt Disney Presents, a museum-like walk-through attraction that explores Walt Disney's life and legacy through photos, models, rare artifacts, and a short biographical film narrated by Julie Andrews.

Sunset Boulevard
 
 The Twilight Zone Tower of Terror is a thrill ride which drops guests in an elevator in a randomized set of four sequences- each involving multiple high speed drops and ascents.
 Rock 'n' Roller Coaster Starring Aerosmith, an indoor roller coaster in the dark with three inversions and a high-speed launch.
 Lightning McQueen's Racing Academy, The completely indoor Sunset Showcase hosts Lightning McQueen's Racing Academy, and features Lightning McQueen and other Cars characters teaching "rookie racers" about the lessons they've learned when racing.
 Beauty and the Beast – Live on Stage, a simplified version of the film.  Appeared on Hollywood Boulevard until the Theater of the Stars moved to Sunset Boulevard in July 1994.
 Fantasmic! — held in the Hollywood Hills Amphitheater, this live show serves as the park’s nighttime spectacular; however, due to inclement weather and other scheduling situations, it is not held every night.

Entertainment

Theater of the Stars
 Hollywood! Hollywood! A Star-Studded Spectacular (May 1 – August 31, 1989)
 Dick Tracy starring in Diamond Double-Cross (May 21, 1990 – February 16, 1991)
 Hollywood's Pretty Woman (September 24 – November 3, 1991)
 Beauty and the Beast – Live on Stage (November 22, 1991 – March 12, 2020, August 15, 2021 – present)
 Used for seasonal special events: Star Wars Weekends, etc. (2015)
 The Music of Pixar Live! (May 26 – August 27, 2017)
 Disney Socienty Orchestra and Friends (August 2 - October 3, 2020)
The theater is also used for occasional corporate, seasonal, promotional and internal events, and presentations.

Hyperion Theater
Formerly known as SuperStar Television Theater (1989–98; 2009–14) and ABC TV Theater (1999–2008)
 SuperStar Television (May 1, 1989 – September 26, 1998)
 Doug Live! (March 15, 1999 – May 12, 2001)
 Get Happy...With ABC! (July 1 – October 5, 2002)
 The American Idol Experience (February 14, 2009 – August 30, 2014)
 For the First Time in Forever: A Frozen Sing-Along Celebration (June 17, 2015 – present)

Mickey Shorts Theater
Formerly known as Monster Sound Studio (1989–97) and ABC Sound Studio (1997–2012)
 The Monster Sound Show (May 1, 1989 – June 30, 1997)
 One Saturday Morning Sound Show (July 1, 1997 – February 20, 1999)
 Sounds Dangerous! (April 22, 1999 – January 4, 2009, seasonally until May 18, 2012)
 Jedi Training Academy Sign-Up/Carbon Freeze Me (2012–15)
 Star Wars: Path of the Jedi (December 4, 2015 – May 14, 2018)
 Mickey & Minnie in Vacation Fun (March 4, 2020 – present)

Hollywood Boulevard
 High School Musical Pep Rally (January 22 – September 14, 2007)
 High School Musical 2: School's Out (September 23, 2007 – September 13, 2008)
 High School Musical 3: Right Here! Right Now! (October 24, 2008 – October 2, 2010)
 Disney Channel Rocks! (October 22, 2010 – April 6, 2013)
 March of the First Order (May 4, 2016 – July 6, 2019)

New York Street
This entertainment venue is no longer operating as it has been demolished for Star Wars: Galaxy's Edge
 Teenage Mutant Ninja Turtles (July 1, 1990 – May 31, 1995)
 Muppets on Location: The Days of Swine & Roses (September 16, 1991 – January 23, 1994)
 Ace Ventura: Pet Detective – Live in Action (November 10, 1995 – ? 1996)
 Goosebumps HorrorLand Fright Show and Funhouse (October 8, 1997 – November 1, 1998)
 Mulch! Sweat and Shears! (2011–15)

Premiere Theater
This entertainment venue is no longer operating as it has been demolished for Star Wars: Galaxy's Edge
 Beauty and the Beast – Live on Stage (1993–94; built on a temporary basis while Theater of the Stars was being constructed)
 The Spirit of Pocahontas (June 23, 1995 – February 24, 1996)
 The Hunchback of Notre Dame – A Musical Adventure (June 21, 1996 – September 28, 2002)
 Used for seasonal special events: Star Wars Weekends, etc. (January 2008 – July 5, 2014)
 For the First Time in Forever: A Frozen Sing-Along Celebration (July 5, 2014 – June 16, 2015)

Walt Disney Theatre
This entertainment venue is no longer operating as it closed to make room for Toy Story Mania!, which was became part of Toy Story Land
 Making of:
 The Lion King (1994–95)
 Pocahontas: A Legend Comes to Life (July 1995)
 Toy Story (? 1995 – June 22, 1996)
 The Hunchback of Notre Dame (premiered 1996)
 Evita (January 10 – July 13, 1997)
 George of the Jungle (July 14 – November 20, 1997)
 Flubber (November 21, 1997 – January 1998)
 Armageddon (July 1, 1998 – June 1999)
 Haunted Mansion (October 8, 2003 – May 1, 2004)
 Who Wants to Be a Millionaire – Play It! (April 7, 2001 – August 19, 2006)
 Toy Story Mania!/Mr. Potato Head Boardwalk Barker (May 31, 2008 – present) (also parts of Toy Story Land)

Animation Courtyard Theater
 Coming Attractions (May 1, 1989 – ? 1990)
 Here Come the Muppets (May 25, 1990 – September 2, 1991)
 Voyage of the Little Mermaid (January 7, 1992 – March 12, 2020)

Soundstage Theater
 Soundstage Restaurant (May 1, 1989 – November 14, 1998; featured sets over the years from Big Business, Beauty and the Beast, Aladdin, Pocahontas, The Hunchback of Notre Dame, Hercules, and Mulan)
 Bear in the Big Blue House – Live on Stage (June 7, 1999 – August 4, 2001)
 Playhouse Disney – Live on Stage!
 (October 1, 2001 – April 3, 2005; consisted of Bear in the Big Blue House, Rolie Polie Olie, Stanley, and The Book of Pooh)
 (April 11, 2005 – January 1, 2008; consisted of Bear in the Big Blue House, JoJo's Circus, Stanley, and The Book of Pooh)
 (February 1, 2008 – January 29, 2011; consisted of Mickey Mouse Clubhouse, Handy Manny, Little Einsteins, and My Friends Tigger & Pooh)
 Disney Junior – Live on Stage!
 (March 4, 2011 – January 13, 2013; consisted of Mickey Mouse Clubhouse, Handy Manny, Little Einsteins, and Jake and the Never Land Pirates)
 (February 15, 2013 – September 1, 2018; consisted of Mickey Mouse Clubhouse, Sofia the First, Doc McStuffins, and Jake and the Never Land Pirates)
 Disney Junior Play and Dance!
 (December 22, 2018 – November 1, 2020; consisted of Mickey and the Roadster Racers, Vampirina, Doc McStuffins, and The Lion Guard)
 (November 2, 2020 – Fall 2023; consisted of Mickey and the Roadster Racers, Vampirina, Doc McStuffins, and Mira, Royal Detective)
 (Fall 2023 – present; consisted of Mickey Mouse Funhouse, Spidey and His Amazing Friends, Alice's Wonderland Bakery, and Firebuds)

Hollywood Hills Amphitheater
 Fantasmic! (October 15, 1998 – March 13, 2020; November 3, 2022 - present)

Nighttime entertainment
 Sorcery in the Sky (May 29, 1990 – October 1998) — This fireworks show debuted in 1990 when the film Fantasia was celebrating its 50th anniversary, and featured music score from such films as Puttin' on the Ritz, The Wizard of Oz, Singin' in the Rain, The Bridge on the River Kwai, Mary Poppins, Close Encounters of the Third Kind, Star Wars, Chariots of Fire, Raiders of the Lost Ark, and of course Fantasia. The show was cancelled in 1998, and its park replacement was Fantasmic!, debuting later that same year. The show was brought back from 2001 to 2003 for performances on July 4 and New Year's Eve before being replaced with new shows in 2004. While Sorcery in the Sky is no longer performed, a Hollywood-themed fireworks show is still occasionally presented during corporate functions and on special evenings such as New Year's Eve and Independence Day.
 Fantasmic! (October 15, 1998 – March 12, 2020; November 3, 2022 - present) — This nighttime spectacle with mist projection screens, fireworks, water fountains, pyrotechnics, and Disney characters has drawn record numbers of guests to the park. The show was updated with new animation and live-action sequences when it returned on November 3, 2022.
 Lights, Camera, Happy New Year! (2004–07) — This show debuted in 2004 as the New Year's Eve fireworks display for Disney's Hollywood Studios. A visually similar display was shown on Independence Day until 2011 when it was replaced by a new show.
 Rock the Night Fireworks (2008–15) — This was the  New Year's Eve fireworks display. The show stared the park's in-house band Mulch, Sweat and Shears, and the fireworks were set to the band's live music performance. Occasionally, the show was performed outside of the New Year's holiday.
 Rockin' Fourth of July Celebration (2011–2017) — This is the former Independence Day fireworks display. It stared Mulch, Sweat and Shears, and was a similar set up to the New Year's show.
 Frozen Fireworks Spectacular (2014–15; seasonal)
 Symphony in the Stars: A Galactic Spectacular (2014–15; seasonal, 2015–16) — A Star Wars-themed fireworks show featuring John Williams' music. This fireworks show was first presented at a private showing on December 17, 2015 during an opening night event for The Force Awakens, and had been a nightly fireworks show until 2016.
 Star Wars: A Galactic Spectacular (June 17, 2016 – March 12, 2020) — A "second-generation" version of Symphony in the Stars and the largest fireworks display in the park's history. The show featured fireworks, projection mapping, fire effects, lasers, fog effects, and searchlights.
 Jingle Bell, Jingle BAM! (November 14, 2016 – January 5, 2020) — A seasonal holiday-themed fireworks and projection mapping display featuring fireworks, projection mapping, lasers, artificial snow, and searchlights, with a story based on the Prep & Landing franchise.
 Disney Movie Magic (2017–19; 2021- present) — A projection mapping show themed to Walt Disney Studios' live-action films, including Beauty and the Beast, Mary Poppins, The Jungle Book, Pirates of the Caribbean, Indiana Jones, Tron: Legacy, Doctor Strange, and Guardians of the Galaxy.
Wonderful World of Animation (May 1, 2019 – March 12, 2020; August 1, 2021 - present) The show will kickoff with a tribute to the beginning of Disney animation, Mickey Mouse, and be followed by segments highlighting a number of animated feature film. Concept art currently confirms Snow White and the Seven Dwarfs, Sleeping Beauty, The Little Mermaid, Beauty and the Beast, Aladdin, Lilo & Stitch, Finding Nemo, The Incredibles, Frozen, Big Hero 6, Zootopia, Cars 3, Coco, and Ralph Breaks the Internet. Chris Diamantopoulos voices the 2013 edition of Mickey Mouse in a cameo appearance.

Parades
 Dinosaurs Live (September 26, 1991 – August 29, 1992)
 Aladdin's Royal Caravan (December 21, 1992 – August 27, 1995)
 Toy Story Parade (November 22, 1995 – June 8, 1997)
 Hercules "Zero to Hero" Victory Parade (June 27, 1997 – April 18, 1998)
 Mulan Parade (June 19, 1998 – March 11, 2001)
 Disney Stars and Motor Cars Parade (October 1, 2001 – March 8, 2008)
 Block Party Bash (March 14, 2008 – January 1, 2011)
 Pixar Pals Countdown To Fun! (January 16, 2011 – April 6, 2013)
 25th Anniversary Parade (May 1, 2014)
 Frozen Royal Welcome Ceremony (Summer 2014–2015; seasonal)

Former attractions

Characters

Current Characters

Seen in Hollywood Boulevard
 Donald Duck and Daisy Duck
 Chip 'n' Dale
 Thomas O'Malley, Duchess, Marie, Toulouse, Berlioz, Edgar Balthazar, Scat Cat, Shun Gon the Chinese Cat, Hit Cat the English Cat, Peppo the Italian Cat and Billy Boss the Russian Cat from The Aristocats

Seen in Echo Lake
 Olaf
 Indiana Jones and Marion Ravenwood

Seen in Grand Avenue
 Goofy and Max Goof
 Pete and P.J. Pete
 Kermit the Frog
 Miss Piggy
 Gonzo
 Fozzie Bear
 Sweetums

Seen in Star Wars: Galaxy's Edge
 Kylo Ren
 First Order Stormtroopers
 C-3PO
 R2-D2
 Rey
 Chewbacca
 Yoda
 Admiral Ackbar
 Emperor Palpatine
 Emperor's Royal Guard
 Captain Phasma
 Porg
 Vi Moradi

Seen in Toy Story Land
 Woody
 Bo Peep
 Jessie
 Buzz Lightyear
 Green Army Men

Seen in Pixar Place
 Mr. Incredible, Elastigirl and Frozone from The Incredibles
 Edna Mode

Seen in Commissary Lane
 Mickey Mouse and Minnie Mouse

Seen in Animation Courtyard
 Pluto
 Vampirina
 Doc McStuffins
 Fancy Nancy
 Baby Kermit, Baby Miss Piggy, Baby Gonzo, Baby Fozzie, Baby Animal and Summer Penguin from Muppet Babies
 Ariel, Prince Eric, Flounder, Sebastian, Ursula and Max from The Little Mermaid
 Darth Vader
 Chewbacca
 BB-8
 Stormtroopers
 James P. Sullivan from Monsters, Inc.

Seen in Sunset Boulevard
 Belle, Beast/Prince Adam, Lumiére, Cogsworth, Mrs. Potts, Chip Potts, Gaston and the Bimbettes Beauty and the Beast
 Cruz Ramirez and DJ from Cars
 Evie Starlight
 Ginny Vermouth
 Phoebe Bizarre
 Cloe Canard
 Betty Shambles
 Flora Fiera
 Ace Victory
 Stone Granite
 Officer Pat Friskem
 Officer William Club
 Officer Percival Peabody
 Oscar Meyer Weiner
 Juan Scenario
 Jack Diamond
 Mayor Sonny Burbank
 Beau Wrangler
 Buddy Flowers
 Ronald McDonald, Grimace, Birdie the Early Bird and Hamburglar
 Chuck E. Cheese, Helen Henny, Mr. Munch, Jasper T. Jowls and Pasqually the Chef
 Kool-Aid Man

Former characters 
 Ace Ventura
 Dick Tracy Mobsters
 Animal, Dr. Teeth, Floyd Pepper, Janice, Zoot and Bean Bunny
 Roger Rabbit
 Baby, Earl, Fran, Robbie, Charlene and Ethyl from Jim Henson's Dinosaurs
 Leonardo, Donatello, Raphael, Michelangelo and April O'Neil
 Bugs Bunny, Daffy Duck, Porky Pig, Tweety, Sylvester the Cat, Yosemite Sam, Foghorn Leghorn, Marvin the Martian, Pepé Le Pew, Speedy Gonzales, Tasmanian Devil, Wile E. Coyote and Michigan J. Frog
 Tom Cat and Jerry Mouse
 Pink Panther
 Special Agent Oso
 Handy Manny
 Jake from Jake and the Never Land Pirates
 Leo, June, Quincy, and Annie from Little Einsteins
 Jojo and Goliath the Lion
 Jawas
 Star-Lord and Baby Groot
 Moana
 Baymax and Hiro Hamada
 Bolt, Mittens, and Rhino
 Lots-O’-Hugging Bear from Toy Story 3
 Carl Fredricksen, Russell, and Dug from Up
 Winnie the Pooh
 Sofia the First
 Wreck-It Ralph and Vanellope Von Schweetz
 Pink Ranger (Power Rangers: Time Force), Lunar Wolf Ranger (Power Rangers: Wild Force), Green Ranger (Power Rangers: Ninja Storm), White Dino Ranger (Power Rangers: Dino Thunder), Red Ranger (Power Rangers: SPD), Pink Ranger (Power Rangers: Mystic Force), Yellow Ranger (Power Rangers: Operation Overdrive), Blue Ranger (Power Rangers: Jungle Fury), and Green Ranger (Power Rangers RPM)
 Kim Possible and Ron Stoppable
 Phineas Flynn and Ferb Fletcher
 Lightning McQueen and Mater
 Rockhopper and Bambadee
 Mike Wazowski from Monsters, Inc.

See also
 List of Disney theme park attractions
 List of lands at Disney theme parks
 List of Magic Kingdom attractions
 List of Epcot attractions
 List of Disney's Animal Kingdom attractions

References

 

Disney's Hollywood Studios